The Museo de UTE is a museum located in Barrio Centro in Montevideo, Uruguay.
Specialized in the history, science and technology of Uruguay, the museum is directly dependent on the UTE. It exposes diverse elements linked to the history of the Uruguayan company. To visit the museum, one must coordinate a guided tour from Monday to Friday from 9AM to 5PM. This is one of the museums that adheres to the day of the Uruguayan heritage. The museum has the peculiarity of being located in an old house. The collection shows part of the country's electrical history and the preservation of old parts, tools and an incandescent lamp from 1879.

References

External links
 

Science museums in Uruguay
Museums in Montevideo
Museums established in 1992